The RIBA House of the Year, formerly the Manser Medal is an award given annually by the Royal Institute of British Architects for "the best new house designed by an architect in the UK".

In 2001, Architects' Journal inaugurated the annual Manser Medal, named after Michael Manser, to recognise the best completed house in the UK. It was rebranded as the RIBA House of the Year in 2015.

Selected winners
2021: House on the Hill by Alison Brooks Architects
2019: House Lessans, by McGonigle McGrath
2018: Lochside House, by HaysomWardMiller Architects
2017: Caring Wood, by James Macdonald Wright and Niall Maxwell
2016: The Murphy House, Edinburgh, by Richard Murphy- see also longlist
2015: Flint House, Buckinghamshire by Charlotte Skene Catling
2014: Stormy Castle, Gower peninsula, by Loyn & Co

References

Architecture awards
Royal Institute of British Architects